The Greek honors system goes back to 1829 and the establishment of the Order of the Redeemer at the Fourth National Assembly at Argos. However, the relevant decree was signed in Nafplio by King Otto on May 20, 1833. The Grand Cross of the Order of the Redeemer remains the highest honor of Greece to this day.

Hellenic Republic

Orders 
  Order of the Redeemer
  Order of Honour
  Order of the Phoenix
  Order of Beneficence (restricted to females)

Kingdom of Greece 
  Order of the Redeemer
  Order of St. George and Constantine (dynastic)
  Order of St. Olga and Sophia (dynastic, restricted to females from royal family)
  Order of George I (dynastic)
  Order of the Phoenix
  Order of Beneficence (restricted to females)

Ranks 
As with most European orders, the Greek orders have the following ranks, in order of precedence:
 Grand Cross
 Grand Officer
 Commander
 Knight of the Gold Cross
 Knight of the Silver Cross

Transmission of honors 
In the past, the insignia of the order were to be returned to the State. However, in recent years, the rule has changed and the heirs of the honoree may keep the insignia.

Grand Master 
The Grand Master of the Greek orders is the head of state of the country. Since 1975, Greece is a republic and the head of state is the President of Greece who is also responsible for awarding them, according to article 46, paragraph 2 of the Constitution of Greece and law 106/1975, upon the recommendation of the Minister for Foreign Affairs.

Selection criteria 
According to Law 106/1975, all proposals made by the Minister for Foreign Affairs are reviewed by the Council on Honors when it applies to Greek citizens, the Greek diaspora, military officers, and government workers. Individuals are selected to reward their contributions to Greece either it be the state, its culture, sports, arts, language, etc.

The Council on Honors, which comes together by decision of the Minister for Foreign Affairs, serves for a two-year term:
 the President of the Council of State
 the President of the Court of Cassation
 two Greek citizens who have been awarded the Grand Cross
 one of the senior most diplomats of the Ministry of Foreign Affairs, either an ambassador or deputy minister
 a senior military officer, set by the Defence General Staff
 a representative from the office of the President of Greece

Medals

Gallantry and merit medals

Military Medals (since 1974) 
  Medal for Gallantry
  Cross of Valour
  War Cross
 Medal for Outstanding Acts
 Medal for Exceptional Acts
  Medal of Military Merit
 Long Service and Good Conduct Medal

Military commendations 

 Commendation for Leadership of the General Staff (Hellenic National Defence General Staff, Hellenic Army General Staff, Hellenic Air Force General Staff, Hellenic Navy General Staff)
 Star for Merit and Honour
 Medal for Merit and Honour
 Commemoration for Leadership of a formation or extant unit
 Commendation for Meritorious Command
 Commendation for Long Service in Corps and Joint Corps (e.g. Judicial Corps)
 Commendation for Service as a Staff Officer
 Commendation for Service in a General Staff
 Commendation for Participation in Peacekeeping Operations

Police Medals (since 1985) 
 Police Medal for Gallantry
 Police Cross
 Medal of Police Merit
 Long Service and Good Conduct Police Medal

Police commendations 

 Commendation for Leadership of the Hellenic Police
 Star for Merit and Honour
 Commendation for Meritorious Command
 Commendation for Meritorious Staff Service
 Commendation for Meritorious Staff Service as a Special Duty Officer

Fire Service Medals (since 1998) 
 Fire Service Medal for Gallantry
 Fire Service Cross
 Medal of Fire Service Merit

Coast Guard commendations 

 Commendation for Leadership of the Coast Guard
 Star for Merit and Honour
 Medal for Merit and Honour
 Commemoration for Leadership of a Regional Coast Guard Command
 Commendation for Meritorious Command
 Commendation for Service as a Staff Officer
 Commendation for Meritorious Staff Service
 Commendation for Long Service

Medals no longer awarded

Hellenic Gendarmerie (1946–1985) 

 Medal of Valour
 Medal for Gallantry
 Medal for Self-Sacrifice
 War Cross
 Medal for Outstanding Acts
 Medal of Military Merit
 Medal of Merit
 Medal for Long and Meritorious Service

Cities Police (1946–1985) 

 Police Medal
 Medal for Police Merit
 Police Cross

Commemorative and campaign medals 
 Cross for the War of Independence 1821–29
 Cross for the Bavarian Auxiliary Corps
 Medal for the Proclamation of the Constitution of 1843
 Medal for the Greco-Turkish War of 1912–1913
 Medal for the Greco-Bulgarian War
 Medal for the Macedonian Struggle (1904–08)
 Inter-Allied Victory Medal (1916–18)
 Royal Hellenic Navy Campaign Cross (1940–45)
 Maritime War Cross
 Medal for the Air Defense of Alexandria
 Medal for the War of 1940–1941
 Medal for the War of 1941–1945
 Medal for the National Resistance (1941–45)
 United Nations Korea Medal (1950–53)
 Centenary Memorial Medal of the Greek Royal Family
 Flying Cross
 Air Force Merit Cross
 Medal for Operations in Cyprus (1964, 1967, 1974)

Honorees 
Those that have been honored by one of the Greek State Orders are given the right to wear their insignia for life, provided they have not been stricken from the rolls of their respective order, as per the penal code or by decision of the Council on Honors. The latter group may take such a decision if it deems that the person retaining the honor causes public discomfort or negatively affects the prestige of the Order. After the death of the honoree, the insignia may be kept by his or her heirs.

References

Further reading 

 
 

 
Greek awards